Mahesh Neelkanth Buch was an Indian civil servant and urban planner, considered by many as the architect of modern Bhopal. The Government of India honored him, in 2011, with Padma Bhushan, the third highest civilian award, for his services to the nation.

Biography

Mahesh N. Buch was born on 5 October 1934, in Sahiwal, pre-partition Punjab. He had his schooling in Lahore and later at Rajkumar College, Rajkot. He graduated in Economics from the St. Stephen's College, Delhi University in 1954 and moved to Pembroke College, Cambridge University for his post graduate studies which he completed in 1956. In 1957, he joined the Indian Administrative Service in the Madhya Pradesh cadre. During 1967–68, he served as the Parvin Fellow at the Woodrow Wilson School of the Princeton University. In 2002, he was conferred the title Doctor of Science (DSc) from the Rajiv Gandhi Technical University. He held several important portfolios in his career such as Principal Secretary in Madhya Pradesh.

Buch took voluntary retirement from the government service, as the Principal Secretary of the State Government, in 1984, and founded the NGO, the National Centre for Human Settlements and Environment, Bhopal for which he served as the Chairman.

Buch died on 6 June 2015 succumbing to a paralytic attack which followed cardiac problems. He was married to Nirmala, a government servant who worked as the adviser to the Chief Minister under the Uma Bharati government and the couple had a son, Vineet. The family lived in Bhopal at the time of his death.

Positions held

M. N. Buch held several government positions of authority during his civil service such as the post of the District Collector, District Magistrate, Director, Government Secretary and the Commissioner of various departments such as Tribal Welfare, Housing, Forests and Town country planning. Some of the other positions are:
 Vice Chairman - Delhi Development Authority
 Director General of the National Institute of Urban Affairs
 Vice-Chairman - National Commission on Urbanization
 Chairman - Lutyens Bungalow Zone Committee of the Government of India 
 Chairman - Committee on the Heritage Zone of Mehrauli
 Chairman - Empowered Committee for the New Vidhan Sabha building in Madhya Pradesh
 Chairman - Board of Governors ABV – Indian Institute of Information Technology and Management, Gwalior
 Dean - Centre for Governance and Political Studies
 Chairman - National Centre for Human Settlements and Environment
 Chairman - Atal Bihari Vajpayee Indian Institute of Information Technology and Management

Personal traits and legacy
Buch has been reported to be a straight-talking, no nonsense bureaucrat. He was credited with the initial efforts in the modernization of Bhopal. The organization he founded, the National Centre for Human Settlements and Environment, focusses on the sustainable development of settlements in a holistic manner.

Awards and recognitions
 Padma Bhushan - 2011
 Man of Vision Award - the Hindustan Times - 2003
 Aga Khan Award - 1998
 UNEP Award - 1995

Writings
M. N. Buch has written four books on urban planning.
 
 
 
 

M. N. Buch has also been a writer of articles, which have been published in many leading publications; a few of the articles are:

 Dr. M. N. Buch (Oct 2012). "Is Verrier Elwin Still Relevant? –A Study of the Bhils of Jhabua". Vivekananda International Foundation.

References

External links
 

1934 births
2015 deaths
Recipients of the Padma Bhushan in civil service
Scientists from Bhopal
Indian Administrative Service officers
People from Sahiwal District
Indian urban planners
Writers from Bhopal
20th-century Indian non-fiction writers
Indian social sciences writers
20th-century Indian architects